Liberty Bell Park was an American race track in Northeast Philadelphia that held harness racing and Thoroughbred horse racing from 1963  until 1986.
 The site, northeast of the intersection of Knights and Woodhaven Roads, was derived from several farms and smaller farmettes.

Gordon's Mill Rd, a street off of Knights Road east to the bridge over the Poquessing Creek, was stricken and vacated from the Philadelphia city plan in 1962 to make way for the racing facility. Gravel Pike, now Byberry Road, extended east to the Poquessing Creek where a small bridge carried the road into Bucks County; now it is a closed bridge. Creek Edge Gardens is still located in the 4300 block of Byberry Road, one of the last vestiges of the pre-1962 style of homes and business in this once pristine area.

The harness track was a  track, but when thoroughbred racing was made legal in 1968, a  track was built using the homestretch and front of the harness track until Keystone Race Track (now Parx Casino and Racing) was built in 1974.

The Philadelphia Mills shopping center now stands on the site, along with other stores such as Dick's Sporting Goods and Big Lots.

References

Defunct horse racing venues in Pennsylvania
History of Philadelphia
1963 establishments in Pennsylvania
1986 disestablishments in Pennsylvania